Lutfor Rahman Khan Azad is a Bangladesh Nationalist Party politician and a former Jatiya Sangsad member representing the Tangail-3 constituency. He served as the state minister of 5 different ministries during 2001–2006 in the Second Khaleda Cabinet - Ministry of Science and Technology, Ministry of Labour and Employment, Ministry of Jute, Ministry of NGO Affairs, and Ministry of Expatriates' Welfare and Overseas Employment.

Career
Azad was elected from Tangail-3 as a candidate of Bangladesh Nationalist Party (BNP) in 1991, 1996, and 2001. In the three elections he beat Shamsur Rahman Khan Shahjahan, candidate of Bangladesh Awami League and his cousin.

On 2 January 2010, Azad was appointed as one of the international affairs secretaries of Bangladesh Nationalist Party.

References

Living people
Bangladesh Nationalist Party politicians
5th Jatiya Sangsad members
6th Jatiya Sangsad members
7th Jatiya Sangsad members
8th Jatiya Sangsad members
State Ministers of Science and Technology (Bangladesh)
State Ministers of Labour and Employment (Bangladesh)
State Ministers of Jute
State Ministers of Expatriates' Welfare and Overseas Employment (Bangladesh)
Year of birth missing (living people)
Place of birth missing (living people)